Delphine Galou (born 1977) is a French contralto. She was the "Discovery of the Year" of the French Association for the Promotion of Young Artists in 2004. Galou's outstanding vocal technique combined with noble bearing allow her performances of the most virtuoso roles of the baroque repertoire.

Early life and education

Galou was born in Paris in 1977, and studied philosophy at the Sorbonne while also studying piano and voice.

Career

Galou started her career in 2000 as a member of the ensemble of the "Jeunes Voix du Rhin", and performed at the Opéra national du Rhin in roles such as Hänsel in Hänsel und Gretel, Lucretia in The Rape of Lucretia, and Mercedes in Carmen, and she was subsequently a guest in Rennes, Dijon, Caen, Angers-Nantes, Toulon, Nancy, Luxemburg, Freiburg, Basel, St Gallen, at the Händel Festival in Karlsruhe, and at the Schwetzingen Festival.

Galou has established herself internationally as a George Frideric Händel specialist, with parts such as Giulio Cesare, Rinaldo, Alessandro, Andronico (Tamerlano), Zenobia (Radamisto), and Bradamante (Alcina). In 2011–2012, she made her sensational debut at the Théâtre des Champs-Élysées in the title role of Orlando furioso by Antonio Vivaldi. She also debuted at the Royal Opera House of London (Niobe by Steffani), and performed the title role in The Rape of Lucretia at the Angers-Nantes Opera. Her 2011–2012 season was highlighted by Handel's Il trionfo del Tempo e del Disinganno at the Berlin State Opera under the baton of Marc Minkowski, Alcina (Bradamante) at the Lausanne Opera under the baton of Ottavio Dantone, and Rinaldo (title role) in Reggio Emilia and Ferrara. Upcoming plans include Il ritorno d'Ulisse in Patria (Penelope) by Monteverdi at the Theater an der Wien under the baton of Christophe Rousset, and Tamerlano (Andronico) at the Théâtre royal de la Monnaie in Brussels.

Galou has collaborated with orchestras such as the Balthasar-Neumann-Ensemble (Thomas Hengelbrock), I Barocchisti (Diego Fasolis), Accademia Bizantina (Ottavio Dantone), Collegium 1704 (Václav Luks), Venice Baroque Orchestra (Andrea Marcon), Il Complesso Barocco (Alan Curtis), Les Siècles (François-Xavier Roth), Les Arts Florissants (Jonathan Cohen), Le Concert des Nations (Jordi Savall), Ensemble Matheus (Jean-Christophe Spinosi) and Les Musiciens du Louvre Grenoble (Marc Minkowski).

Regular guest soloist positions
As a concert soloist, Galou is, among others, a regular guest of the Beaune Baroque Festival, where she was acclaimed in Rinaldo and Alessandro by Händel, Semiramide by Nicola Porpora, and Juditha triumphans and Orlando furioso by Vivaldi.

Recordings
Galou has also taken part in the CD recording of Porpora's Vespro per la Festività dell'Assunta under the baton of Martin Gester (live recording - Ambronay Editions. Released in 2011), Vivaldi's Teuzzone under the baton of Jordi Savall (2012 - Naïve Records) and Vivaldi's Orlando furioso under the baton of Federico Maria Sardelli (2012 - Naïve Records). A YouTube video featuring Galou's performance of "Erbarme dich, mein Gott" from Bach's Matthäuspassion had, as of April 2021, received more than 6 million views.

Solo recitals
Agitata, Accademia Bizantina, 2017, Ottavio Dantone, Alpha.

Roles
This is a partial list of roles based on information from the artist's website.

References

Further reading
 Gramilano interview, 2019

External links
 
A gorgeously sung and strangely staged 'Il Trionfo' at the Berlin Staatsoper

21st-century French women opera singers
Living people
French contraltos
Operatic contraltos
1977 births
Singers from Paris